The Michigan–Notre Dame men's ice hockey rivalry is a college ice hockey rivalry between Michigan Wolverines men's ice hockey and Notre Dame Fighting Irish men's ice hockey that is part of the larger rivalry between the University of Michigan and Notre Dame University. The rivalry between the Wolverines and Fighting Irish notably includes the football rivalry.

Michigan currently leads the series, which began on February 4, 1923, 84–67–5, as of the end of the 2021–22 season. The regular home arenas for the teams are Yost Ice Arena (capacity 5,800) and Compton Family Ice Arena (capacity 5,022). As of the 2017–18 season, both teams are members of the Big Ten Conference, although they have previously competed together in both the Central Collegiate Hockey Association (CCHA) (1992–2013) and the Western Collegiate Hockey Association (WCHA) (1971–1981). The two schools play at least four times a year through conference play. The teams have met three times in the NCAA Division I men's ice hockey tournament, including twice in the Frozen Four, with Notre Dame winning twice, and Michigan winning once.

Game results
Full game results for the rivalry.

Notes

Michigan Notre Dame
Michigan Wolverines men's ice hockey
Notre Dame Fighting Irish ice hockey